The 2019 AFA Senior Male League is the 20th season of the AFA Senior Male League, the men's football league in Anguilla.

League table

References

AFA Senior Male League seasons
2018–19 in Caribbean football leagues
2019–20 in Caribbean football leagues